Toronto Ukrainians (Sports Association Toronto Ukrainians) is a Canadian soccer team. The club was founded on June 30, 1948 by Ukrainians that had been settled in the Toronto after second world war.

The team's colours are red and black, similar to those of the Flag of the UPA and yellow, similar to those of the Ukraine national football team.

History
The team has had a very storied history, considering it was formed by such a small diaspora group in spring 1948. In beginning was calling Skala. The club was founded on 30 June 1948. The team played in the National Soccer League until 1981. During this period the team attracted many soccer stars, such as Ostap Steckiw, Walt Zakaluznyj and Myron Bereza who played for the Canada national football team.

Throughout its history Toronto Ukrainians has hosted international friendly matches with a teams such as Heart of Midlothian F.C., Rangers F.C., Tottenham Hotspur F.C., West Bromwich Albion F.C., Admira Wien, Rapid Wien and Wacker Wien.

Year-by-year

Honours
National Soccer League
NSL Playoff Champions: 5
1951, 1953, 1961, 1963, 1964

NSL Playoff Runner-Up: 1
1965

NSL Champions: 6
1953, 1954, 1955, 1964, 1965, 1966

NSL Runner-Up: 1
1962

See also
 Ukraina Lwów
 Montreal Ukrainians

References
Notes

External links
 Українська футбольна діаспора
 Кленовый лист на вышиванке
 Canadian Soccer League

Canadian National Soccer League teams
Ukrainians
Ukrainian association football clubs outside Ukraine
Association football clubs established in 1948
Ukrainian-Canadian culture in Ontario
Ukrainian diaspora in Canada
1948 establishments in Ontario